H'art Songs is an album by the American composer and musician Moondog, released in 1978 via Kopf.

Background and recording
H'art Songs was the second album Moondog made in Germany, and in comparison to the first, Moondog in Europe, it consists of more new material and is song-driven. The songs were written and recorded in 1977. Moondog described the songs in the liner notes as having "an appeal to a whole range of tastes". The satirical lyrics deal with Moondog's view of life and subjects including animal rights, the exploitation of natural resources and the outlaw John Wesley Hardin.

Reception
The critic David Keenan wrote: "The 10 superficially simplistic piano-led pop songs, with lyrics like diamond-sharp haiku, open out with each listen to reveal a musical aesthetic as melodically complex as Johann Sebastian Bach's." Mark Allender of AllMusic described the songs as "little ditties" and wrote that the album combines few and repetitive chord changes with melodies that feel "grandiose or celestial" which makes "the music feel bigger or fuller than it is", creating an exciting effect. Allender complimented Moondog's baritone voice but wrote that the songs can be "a bit too singsongy for more pedestrian tastes and so political that the art suffers somewhat". He rated the album three out of five and described it as "interesting" as a contrast to Moondog's "more complex compositions". Moondog's biographer Robert Scotto wrote that "the novelty is in the subject matter, eccentric yet lyrical, offbeat yet alluring".

Track listing

Personnel
 Moondog – harmonica, keyboards, percussion, vocals
 Fritz Storfinger – keyboards, piano

References

Citations

Sources

 
 

1978 albums
Moondog albums